Horace C. Butterworth (December 3, 1868 – December 8, 1939) was the first head coach for the Chicago Maroons men's basketball team, the fourth head football coach for the Northwestern Wildcats baseball team as well as the fourth head coach for the Temple Owls football team. Additionally, Butterworth was the fourth athletic director for Northwestern and maintain the position from 1903 to 1904.  Butterworth attended Delaware College for his undergraduate studies and completed his doctorate from the University of Chicago in 1898. Even though he had a record of 10–4, his time as the Chicago Maroons head coach was cut short when the university suspended the program based on a lack of interest. In his only season as the Northwestern Wildcats baseball coach his team played a 17-game season, of which 12 games were verses Western Conference opponents. At Temple, his coaching record was 4–0–2.  This ranks him 16th at Temple in total wins and first at Temple by winning percentage.

Head coaching record

Football

References

1868 births
1939 deaths
Chicago Maroons men's basketball coaches
Northwestern Wildcats athletic directors
Northwestern Wildcats baseball coaches
Temple Owls football coaches
University of Chicago alumni
University of Delaware alumni